Morten Karlsen (born 25 March 1979) is a former Danish professional football defender and manager.

He previously played at FC Nordsjælland, Randers FC, FC Zwolle, B.93, Esbjerg fB and Lyngby BK before ending has career at HB Køge.

References

External links
FC Nordsjælland profile
Danish national team profile
Career statistics

1979 births
Living people
Danish men's footballers
Danish expatriate men's footballers
Denmark under-21 international footballers
Boldklubben af 1893 players
PEC Zwolle players
FC Nordsjælland players
Randers FC players
Esbjerg fB players
HB Køge players
Danish Superliga players
Danish 1st Division players
Association football midfielders
Danish expatriate sportspeople in the Netherlands
Expatriate footballers in the Netherlands
Danish 1st Division managers
Footballers from Copenhagen